Township No. 1 may refer to:
Tyringham, Massachusetts
Monterey, Massachusetts
Township 1, Harper County, Kansas